Jonathan Tran is a Vietnamese-American theologian, and currently holds the George W. Baines Chair of Religion at Baylor University.

Biography 
Originally from Southern California, Tran received his BA (1994) from University of California, Riverside and his M.Div. (2002) and Ph.D. (2006) from Duke Divinity School where he studied under Stanley Hauerwas. He is an Associate Professor of Philosophical Theology and holds the George W. Baines Chair of Religion in the Department of Religion at Baylor University, where he researches and teaches theology, ethics, and identity theory.

Works

References 

Living people
American people of Vietnamese descent
American theologians
Duke Divinity School alumni
Baylor University faculty
Year of birth missing (living people)